Prattsville is a hamlet and census-designated place (CDP) in the town of Prattsville, Greene County, New York, United States. The population of the CDP was 355 at the 2010 census, out of a total population of 700 in the town.

Geography
Prattsville is located in western Greene County and occupies the central and northwestern sections of the town of Prattsville. The CDP is bordered to the southwest by Schoharie Creek and to the southeast by its tributary, Batavia Kill. The northwestern edge of the CDP follows the Delaware County line, and the far northern extent of the CDP borders Schoharie County.

New York State Route 23 is Prattsville's Main Street, leading northwest  to Oneonta on the Susquehanna River and southeast  to Catskill on the Hudson River.

Demographics

References

Census-designated places in New York (state)
Hamlets in New York (state)
Census-designated places in Greene County, New York
Hamlets in Greene County, New York